Kalapara (also known as Khepupara) is an upazila of Patuakhali District in the Division of Barisal, Bangladesh.

History
The Rakhain tribe of Bangladesh first settled in this upazila. A section of the people belonging to the Buddhist Rakhain tribe of Arakan came to this upazila in quest of better living and first settled at Khepupara and Kuakata. Tradition goes that the Rakhains on excavating wells traced fresh water in the area and thereby settled there. The Rakhain word 'kansai' means 'beach of fate'. The place was named as Kansai after this. The place was subsequently renamed as Kuakata (digging of well) after the wells dug out by the Rakhanis. The upazila though named as Kalapara, the upazila sadar is known as Khepupara. It is said that two influential Rakhain chiefs used to reside on either side of a canal running northsouth through the upazila, Kalau Magh on the eastern bank and Khepu Magh on the western side. The habitation on eastern bank of the canal was named as Kalapara after the name of Kalau Magh and that on the western bank as Khepupara after Khepu Magh.

Geography
It has 31324 households and total area 483.08 km2. The major rivers are the Andharmanik, Nilganj, and Dhankhali.

Demographics
As of the 2011 Bangladesh census, Kalpara has a population of 237,831. 14.87% of the population live in urban areas. The literacy rate is 52%.

Islam (94.75%) is the predominant religion. Hinduism (4.68%) and Buddhism (0.50%) are minority religions.

As of the 1991 Bangladesh census, Kalapara has a population of 174921. Males constitute 50.89% of the population, and females 49.11%. This Upazila's eighteen up population was 82394. Kalapara has an average literacy rate of 34.9% (7+ years), and the national average of 32.4% literate.

Administration
Kalapara thana was established in 1921 and was turned into an upazila in 1983.

Kalapara Upazila is divided into Kalapara Municipality, Kuakata Municipality, and 12 union parishads: Baliatali, Chakamaia, Champapur, Dalbugonj, Dhankhali, Dulaser, Lalua, Latachapli, Mahipur, Mihagonj, Nilgonj, and Tiakhali. The union parishads are subdivided into 58 mauzas and 239 villages.

Kalapara Municipality and Kuakata Municipality are each subdivided into 9 wards.

The area of the town is 19.49 km2. It has a population of 16330; male 55.18%, female 44.82%. The density of population is 838 per km2. The literacy rate among the town people is 39.37%. The town has one bungalow.

Member of Parliament: Muhibur Rahman Muhib
Chairman: Md Motaleb Howlader
Woman Vice Chairman: Bilkich Jahan
Vice Chairman: Mostafa
Upazila Nirbahi Officer (UNO): Shankar Chandra Baidya.

Points of interest 
Kuakata Buddhist Vihara, Kapradanga Buddhist Math (dilapidated), Mistripara Buddhist Vihara (dilapidated).

 Kuakata, a sea beach offering decent views of the Bay of Bengal.
 Earthen Fort of Kachimkhali Village in Chakamaya Union. 
 Earthen Fort of Newapara Village in Chakamaya Union.
 Mohipur (Fishing Boat).
 Buddhist monastery of Mishripara at Kuataka. 
 Gangamatir Char
 Kaurar Char

Religious institutions
Mosque 275, temple 41, pagoda 4, Buddhist Vihara 8, church 2, mazar 1. Notable institutions includes: Kalapara Jame Masjid, Kuakata Buddhist Vihara, Mazar of Pir Bashiruddin.

See also
Upazilas of Bangladesh
Districts of Bangladesh
Divisions of Bangladesh

References

Upazilas of Patuakhali District